is a Japanese ice hockey player for Daishin Hockey Club and the Japanese national team. She participated at the 2015 IIHF Women's World Championship.

Terashima competed at the 2018 Winter Olympics.

References

1993 births
Living people
Asian Games medalists in ice hockey
Asian Games gold medalists for Japan
Ice hockey players at the 2017 Asian Winter Games
Medalists at the 2017 Asian Winter Games
Ice hockey players at the 2018 Winter Olympics
Japanese women's ice hockey forwards
Olympic ice hockey players of Japan